May 1977: Get Shown the Light is a live album by the American rock band the Grateful Dead. It contains four consecutive complete concerts, recorded on May 5, 7, 8, and 9, 1977, on eleven CDs.  It was released on May 5, 2017.

The album was produced as a box set, in a numbered limited edition of 15,000 copies, and includes the previously unpublished book Cornell '77: The Music, the Myth and the Magnificence of the Grateful Dead's Concert at Barton Hall, by Peter Conners.  It was also produced as an "all music edition" without the book.

The May 8 show, recorded at Barton Hall in Ithaca, New York, was also released on May 5, 2017 as a stand-alone album called Cornell 5/8/77.

May 1977: Get Shown the Light was nominated for a Grammy Award for Best Boxed or Special Limited Edition Package.  The artwork and package design are by Masaki Koike.

Concerts
The album includes these concerts:
May 5, 1977 – Veterans Memorial Coliseum, New Haven, Connecticut
May 7, 1977 – Boston Garden, Boston, Massachusetts
May 8, 1977 – Barton Hall, Ithaca, New York
May 9, 1977 – Buffalo Memorial Auditorium, Buffalo, New York

Critical reception

On Pitchfork, Jesse Jarnow said, "Though Cornell '77 is neither the Dead's most adventurous nor creative performance, it also remains arguably the Best Ever for several enduring reasons. Perhaps chief among them is that it is live Grateful Dead at its most accessible, with the Dead sounding vivid and tight and full of pep, characteristics shared by all four shows on May 1977: Get Shown the Light. Compared to most Grateful Dead shows, Cornell '77 (and its chronological neighbors) are excellent places for (some) newbie listeners to start."

Track listing

May 5, 1977 – Veterans Memorial Coliseum, New Haven, Connecticut
Disc 1
First set:
"Promised Land" (Chuck Berry)
"Sugaree" (Jerry Garcia, Robert Hunter)
"Mama Tried" (Merle Haggard)
"El Paso" (Marty Robbins)
"Tennessee Jed" (Garcia, Hunter)
"Looks Like Rain" (Bob Weir, John Perry Barlow)
"Deal" (Garcia, Hunter)
"Lazy Lightning" > (Weir, Barlow)
"Supplication" (Weir, Barlow)
"Peggy-O" (traditional, arranged by Grateful Dead)
"The Music Never Stopped" (Weir, Barlow)
Disc 2
Second set:
"Bertha" (Garcia, Hunter)
"Estimated Prophet" (Weir, Barlow)
"Scarlet Begonias" > (Garcia, Hunter)
"Fire on the Mountain" > (Mickey Hart, Hunter)
"Good Lovin'" (Rudy Clark, Arthur Resnick)
"St. Stephen" > (Garcia, Phil Lesh, Hunter)
"Sugar Magnolia" (Weir, Hunter)
Encore:
"Johnny B. Goode" (Berry)

May 7, 1977 – Boston Garden, Boston, Massachusetts
Disc 1
First set:
"Bertha" (Garcia, Hunter)
"Cassidy" (Weir, Barlow)
"Deal" (Garcia, Hunter)
"Jack Straw" (Weir, Hunter)
"Peggy-O" (traditional, arranged by Grateful Dead)
"New Minglewood Blues" (traditional, arranged by Grateful Dead)
"Mississippi Half-Step Uptown Toodeloo" > (Garcia, Hunter)
"Big River" (Johnny Cash)
"Tennessee Jed" (Garcia, Hunter)
"The Music Never Stopped" (Weir, Barlow)
Disc 2
Second set:
"Terrapin Station" (Garcia, Hunter)
"Samson and Delilah" (traditional, arranged by Weir)
"Friend of the Devil" (Garcia, John Dawson, Hunter)
"Estimated Prophet" (Weir, Barlow)
Disc 3
"Eyes of the World" > (Garcia, Hunter)
"Drums" > (Hart, Bill Kreutzmann)
"The Wheel" > (Garcia, Hunter, Kreutzmann)
"Wharf Rat" > (Garcia, Hunter)
"Around and Around" (Berry)
Encore:
"U.S. Blues" (Garcia, Hunter)

May 8, 1977 – Barton Hall, Ithaca, New York
Disc 1
First set:
"New Minglewood Blues" (traditional, arranged by Grateful Dead)
"Loser" (Garcia, Hunter)
"El Paso" (Marty Robbins)
"They Love Each Other" (Garcia, Hunter)
"Jack Straw" (Weir, Hunter)
"Deal" (Garcia, Hunter)
"Lazy Lightning" > (Weir, Barlow)
"Supplication" (Weir, Barlow)
"Brown-Eyed Women" (Garcia, Hunter)
"Mama Tried" (Haggard)
"Row Jimmy" (Garcia, Hunter)
Disc 2
"Dancing in the Street" (William Stevenson, Marvin Gaye, Ivy Jo Hunter)
Second set:
"Scarlet Begonias" > (Garcia, Hunter)
"Fire on the Mountain" (Hart, Hunter)
"Estimated Prophet" (Weir, Barlow)
Disc 3
"St. Stephen" > (Garcia, Lesh, Hunter)
"Not Fade Away" > (Norman Petty, Charles Hardin)
"St. Stephen" > (Garcia, Lesh, Hunter)
"Morning Dew" (Bonnie Dobson, Tim Rose)
Encore:
"One More Saturday Night" (Weir)

May 9, 1977 – Buffalo Memorial Auditorium, Buffalo, New York
Disc 1
First set:
"Help On the Way" > (Garcia, Hunter)
"Slipknot!" > (Garcia, Keith Godchaux, Kreutzmann, Lesh, Weir) 
"Franklin's Tower" (Garcia, Hunter)
"Cassidy" (Weir, Barlow)
"Brown-Eyed Women" (Garcia, Hunter)
"Mexicali Blues" (Weir, Barlow)
"Tennessee Jed" (Garcia, Hunter)
"Big River" (Cash)
"Peggy-O" (traditional, arranged by Grateful Dead)
"Sunrise" (Donna Jean Godchaux)
"The Music Never Stopped" (Weir, Barlow)
Disc 2
Second set:
"Bertha" > (Garcia, Hunter)
"Good Lovin'" (Clark, Resnick)
"Ship of Fools" (Garcia, Hunter)
Disc 3
"Estimated Prophet" > (Weir, Barlow)
"The Other One" > (Weir, Kreutzmann)
"Drums" > (Hart, Kreutzmann)
"Not Fade Away" > (Petty, Hardin)
"Comes a Time" > (Garcia, Hunter)
"Sugar Magnolia" (Weir, Hunter)
Encore:
"Uncle John's Band" (Garcia, Hunter)

Personnel
Grateful Dead
Jerry Garcia – guitar, vocals
Donna Jean Godchaux – vocals
Keith Godchaux – keyboards
Mickey Hart – drums
Bill Kreutzmann – drums
Phil Lesh – bass
Bob Weir – guitar, vocals
Production
Produced by Grateful Dead
Produced for release by David Lemieux
Recording: Betty Cantor-Jackson
Mastering: Jeffrey Norman
Tape restoration and speed correction: Jamie Howarth, John Chester
Packaging manager: Amanda Smith
Art direction, design: Masaki Koike
Photos: Doran Tyson, James R. Anderson, Lawrence Reichman, Peter Simon, John Reis, Dean John Smith
Liner notes essay "Get Back Home where You Belong": David Lemieux
Liner notes essay "The Road to Ithaca: Five Days in May": Nicholas G. Meriwether
Hardcover book Cornell '77: The Music, the Myth, and the Magnificence of the Grateful Dead's Concert at Barton Hall: Peter Conners
Executive producer: Mark Pinkus
Associate producers: Doran Tyson, Ivette Ramos
Tapes provided through the assistance of: ABCD Enterprises, LLC
Tape research: Michael Wesley Johnson
Archival research: UC Santa Cruz Grateful Dead Archive

Charts

References

2017 live albums
Grateful Dead live albums
Rhino Records live albums